Carrapatos e Catapultas, sometimes translated as Duck-Ticks and Catapults, is a Brazilian cartoon series produced by the project Anima TV.

The program is a co-production of Elephant Zoom Studio with TV Brasil and the TV Cultura. It was one of two winners of a contest organized to support the creation of Brazilian series.

Series creator and writer Almir Correia, has as his main influences cartoon surrealist comedy such as Rocko's Modern Life and SpongeBob SquarePants, as well as science-fiction series.

The first season of Ticks and Catapults had 14 episodes, made for children aged 8 to 12. Through a mood based on innocent language, the series aims to make young people enjoy and think about issues relevant to their day-to-day lives.

Synopsis 
Ticks and Catapults presents the exciting adventures of ticks with duck beaks named Bum, Bod, Sweepstake and Quietly, who are all friends. On their planet, ticks are born with parachutes and they travel by catapult.

Characters 
 Bum - The main character, a yellow tick. Different from other ticks. He has a calm personality and his best friends are Bum and Sweepstake. He is also responsible for Quietly, his younger cousin. At the end of each episode Bum gets a call from his parents.
 Bod - A green tick, best friend of Bum. Unlike him Bod has a sportier and hectic personality. 
 Sweepstake - A huge purple tick, friend of Bum and Bod. He is not very smart and often ends up doing the wrong thing.
 Quietly - A small beige tick, Bum's cousin. He is very busy and full of energy, and causes big problems. He went to live with Bum after his parents exploded.  His favorite hobby is jumping from catapults, saying "I want to!"

Secondary 
 Mother Bum - Bum's mother now in the afterlife. She often calls home at the end of episode commenting on the achievements made by Bum and his friends.
 Bonaparte - The boss of Bum, Bod and Sweepstake. Short and very nervous. It is a reference to Napoleón Bonaparte, wearing a similar hat.
 Paty - A passionate tick by Bum, works in Suganete. Several ticks are in love with her, though she is interested only in Bum. In one episode two aliens shoot a ray leaving all ticks in love with her.
 Thick Severino - A singer tick baião who lives in a floating stone. Always talking in rhymes, singing, playing accordion, and wearing a bandit hat with sunglasses. He is always in the company of Raimundinho, his triangle-playing assistant. It is a reference to Luiz Gonzaga.
 Doctor Froide (crazy doctor);
 Mrs. Anna (old tick);
 Leonard tick (the inventor);
 Splash (surfer tick);
 Tic and Tac (mobsters, conjoined twins, work for Gift Corleone);
 Gift Corleone (tick archenemy of Bonaparte);
 Super hyper mega tick (superhero ticks);
 Pedracules (archenemy-friend) Super hyper mega tick.

Dubbing

Episodes

Streaming

References

External links 
 Blog da Anima TV 
 Vídeos da TV Brasil 

2010s Brazilian animated television series
2010 Brazilian television series debuts
Brazilian children's animated television series
Portuguese-language television shows